Severe Tropical Cyclone Damien was the strongest cyclone to make landfall in the Western Australian coast since Cyclone Christine in 2013. It was also the strongest Cyclone in the 2019–20 Australian region cyclone season. The fifth tropical low, and the third named storm of the 2019–20 Australian region cyclone season, Damien originated from a monsoon trough over Kimberley.

As a monsoon trough began developing over parts of the Kimberley on 2 February 2020, the BOM noted that an inland tropical disturbance formed over the Northern Territory, within the monsoon trough. On 4 February, it exited land and emerged over the eastern Indian Ocean, and the JTWC named the disturbance as Invest 92S. A Tropical Cyclone Formation Alert was issued early the following day by the JTWC as convection began to steadily develop near the center. The next day, the JTWC issued its first advisory on the system as a tropical storm. Many hours later, the BOM followed suit, upgrading the tropical storm to a Category 1 cyclone and giving it the name Damien.

In preparation for Damien, the Australian Bureau of Meteorology issued a red alert from Whim Creek to Mardie going all the way south to Millstream Chichester National Park and a yellow alert from Port Hedland to Whim Creek stretching southwards to Wittenoom. Evacuation centers were set up in Karratha, and South Hedland. A search and rescue team was also stationed in Port Hedland. Damien brought gale-force winds, heavy-extreme/torrential rain, and extreme floods to Western Australia when it made landfall close to Karratha at February 8, 2020. Wind gusts exceeding 125 mph (205 km/h) were recorded close to the landfall point. Over 230 mm (9.1 in) of rain fell in Karratha and Roebourne from 8–9 February 2020. Around 9,500 people in Pilbara lost power. Besides downed power lines, strong winds also uprooted many trees and caused many buildings to lose their roofs. Karratha Airport was forced to close on the morning of 10 February 2020 after the terminal sustained damage and lost power.

Meteorological history

As a monsoon trough began to develop over parts of the Kimberley on 2 February 2020, the BOM noted that an inland tropical disturbance formed over the Northern Territory, within the monsoon trough. On 4 February, it exited land and emerged over the eastern Indian Ocean, and the JTWC named the disturbance as Invest 92S. A Tropical Cyclone Formation Alert was issued early the following day by the JTWC as convection began to steadily develop near the center. The next day, the JTWC issued its first advisory on the system as a tropical storm. Many hours later, the BOM followed suit, upgrading the tropical storm to a Category 1 cyclone and giving it the name Damien. Damien began tracking south, later intensifying to a powerful category 2 cyclone, later Damien tracks a little to the west, with it quickly changing its track a little to the east while going south, soon it made landfall in the Pilbara region of Western Australia, with winds peak winds of 100 mph, Damien kept tracking west before again moving a little west and quickly dissipating.

Preparations
In preparation for Damien, the Australian Bureau of Meteorology issued a red alert from Whim Creek to Mardie going all the way south to Millstream Chichester National Park, and a yellow alert from Port Hedland to Whim Creek stretching southwards to Wittenoom. Evacuation centers were set up in Karratha, and South Hedland. A search and rescue team was also stationed in Port Hedland. Ports of Port Hedland, Dampier, and Ashburton were closed on Friday. Alongside 20 schools, high schools and learning centers in the region Residents in Pilbara rushed to get their hands on supplies after cities and towns were placed on blue alert, leaving supermarkets shelves empty of freshwater and food.

Impacts
Damien brought gale-force winds, heavy-extreme/torrential rain, and extreme floods to Western Australia when it made landfall close to Karratha at February 8, 2020. Wind gusts exceeding 125 mph (205 km/h) were recorded close to the landfall point. Over 230 mm (9.1 in) of rain fell in Karratha and Roebourne from 8–9 February 2020. Around 9,500 people in Pilbara lost power. Besides downed power lines, strong winds also uprooted many trees and caused many buildings to lose their roofs. The local airport's roof was damaged by uprooted trees, resulting in water leakage into the building, the police station was also damaged by flooding. The Bureau of Meteorology's Dampier radar sustained significant damage due to Damien. Extensive vegetation damage was reported and there was some damage to property. Damages in Karratha exceeded $6 million.

Cleanup
After Cyclone Damien, Karratha coordinated cleanup and relief efforts across cities and towns affected by the cyclone.

Retirement
Later in 2020, the Bureau of Meteorology retired the name Damien due to the damage caused by the storm in Western Australia. It will be replaced by Declan in future seasons.

See also

Tropical cyclones in 2020
Cyclone Veronica – A powerful Tropical cyclone that had a track similar to Damien
2019–20 Australian region cyclone season

References

External links

2019–20 Australian region cyclone season
Tropical cyclones in 2020
Category 3 Australian region cyclones
2020s in Western Australia
2020 in Australia